The 1988–89 Cypriot First Division was the 50th season of the Cypriot top-level football league. Omonia won their 16th title.

Format
Fifteen teams participated in the 1988–89 Cypriot First Division. All teams played against each other twice, once at their home and once away. The team with the most points at the end of the season crowned champions. The last three teams were relegated to the 1989–90 Cypriot Second Division.

The champions ensured their participation in the 1989–90 European Cup and the runners-up in the 1989–90 UEFA Cup.

Point system
Teams received two points for a win, one point for a draw and zero points for a loss.

Changes from previous season
APEP, Alki and Anagennisi were relegated from previous season and played in the 1988–89 Cypriot Second Division. They were replaced by the first two teams of the 1987–88 Cypriot Second Division, Keravnos and Omonia Aradippou.

Stadia and locations

League standings

Results

See also
 Cypriot First Division
 1988–89 Cypriot Cup
 List of top goalscorers in Cypriot First Division by season
 Cypriot football clubs in European competitions

References

Sources

Cypriot First Division seasons
Cyprus
1988–89 in Cypriot football